The 2022 FireKeepers Casino 400 was a NASCAR Cup Series race held on August 7, 2022, at Michigan International Speedway in Brooklyn, Michigan. Contested over 200 laps on the  D-shaped oval, it was the 23rd race of the 2022 NASCAR Cup Series season.

Report

Background

The race was held at Michigan International Speedway, a  moderate-banked D-shaped speedway located in Brooklyn, Michigan. The track is used primarily for NASCAR events. It is known as a "sister track" to Texas World Speedway as MIS's oval design was a direct basis of TWS, with moderate modifications to the banking in the corners, and was used as the basis of Auto Club Speedway. The track is owned by International Speedway Corporation. Michigan International Speedway is recognized as one of motorsports' premier facilities because of its wide racing surface and high banking (by open-wheel standards; the 18-degree banking is modest by stock car standards).

Prior to the race, it was announced Kurt Busch remains under medical suspension following his crash during second-round qualifying at Pocono.  Ty Gibbs will remain in the 45 car.

Entry list
 (R) denotes rookie driver.
 (i) denotes driver who is ineligible for series driver points.

Practice

Practice results

Qualifying

Qualifying results

Race

Stage Results

Stage One
Laps: 45

Stage Two
Laps: 75

Final Stage Results

Stage Three
Laps: 80

Race statistics
 Lead changes: 15 among 10 different drivers
 Cautions/Laps: 7 for 36
 Red flags: 0
 Time of race: 2 hours, 54 minutes and 8 seconds
 Average speed:

Media

Television
USA covered the race on the television side. two-time Michigan winner, Dale Earnhardt Jr., Jeff Burton and Steve Letarte called the race from the broadcast booth. Kim Coon, Parker Kligerman and Marty Snider handled the pit road duties from pit lane.

Radio
Radio coverage of the race was broadcast by Motor Racing Network (MRN) and simulcast on Sirius XM NASCAR Radio. Alex Hayden and Jeff Striegle called the race in the booth while the field was racing on the front stretch. Dave Moody called the race from a billboard outside of turn 2 when the field is racing through turns 1 and 2. Mike Bagley called the race from a platform outside of turn 3 when the field races through turns 3 and 4. Steve Post, Chris Wilner, Dillon Welch and Jason Toy worked pit road for the radio side.

Standings after the race

Drivers' Championship standings

Manufacturers' Championship standings

Note: Only the first 16 positions are included for the driver standings.
. – Driver has clinched a position in the NASCAR Cup Series playoffs.

References

FireKeepers Casino 400
FireKeepers Casino 400
NASCAR races at Michigan International Speedway
FireKeepers Casino 400